The 2022–23 BIBL season is the 15th edition of Balkan International Basketball League (BIBL). The first match in the group stage is expected to take place in October 2022. Teams from Israel, Bulgaria, Montenegro, Kosovo and Ukraine are expected to participate in this competition.

Format
Seven teams will play against each other home-and-away basis. The teams placed 1st and 2nd will advance to the Final Four. while those place 3rd, 4th, 5th and 6th will play in the Quarterfinals to determine the other two teams to advance to the Final Four.

Teams

Regular season

Quarterfinals

Game 1

Game 2

Final Four

Semifinals

Third place

Final

References

External links 
 Official website
 Scoreboard
 Flashcore

2021-22
BIBL
2022–23 in Montenegrin basketball
2022–23 in Israeli basketball